Afronemacheilus abyssinicus is a species of stone loach endemic to Ethiopia. It is known from the Blue Nile at its outlet from Tana Lake (the type locality), with records from the Baro River. Originally the only species in its genus, in 2013 A. kaffa was described based on the Omo population, formerly included in A. abyssinicus.

The specific epithet, abyssinicus, is derived from Latin and means "Abyssinian" or "Ethiopian".

References 

Nemacheilidae
Fish of Lake Tana
Endemic fauna of Ethiopia
Fish described in 1902
Taxobox binomials not recognized by IUCN